Outlaw Rule is a 1935 American Western film directed by S. Roy Luby and starring Reb Russell, Betty Mack and Al Bridge.

Cast
 Reb Russell as Reb Russell
 Betty Mack as Kay Lathrop
 Al Bridge as Deputy Bat Lindstrom
 Yakima Canutt as Blaze Tremaine
 John McGuire as Danny Taylor
 Henry Hall as Link Bishop
 Ralph Lewis as John Lathrop
 Joseph W. Girard as Banker Payton 
 Jack Rockwell as The Whistler
 Jack Kirk as Tubby Jones
 Olin Francis as Jim - Bartender
 Murdock MacQuarrie as Coroner Williamson
 Marin Sais as Mrs. Turk
 Lew Meehan as Barfly
 Dick Botiller as Henchman

References

Bibliography
 Michael R. Pitts. Poverty Row Studios, 1929–1940: An Illustrated History of 55 Independent Film Companies, with a Filmography for Each. McFarland & Company, 2005.

External links
 

1935 films
1935 Western (genre) films
American Western (genre) films
Films directed by S. Roy Luby
American black-and-white films
Revisionist Western (genre) films
1930s English-language films
1930s American films